Syamzha is a rural locality (a selo) and the administrative center of Syamzhensky District of Vologda Oblast, Russia, located on both banks of the Syamzhena River, a tributary of the Kubena River. It also serves as the administrative center of Syamzhensky Selsoviet, one of the ten selsoviets into which the district is administratively divided. Municipally, it is the administrative center of Syamzhenskoye Rural Settlement. Population: 

The name of Syamzha originates from the Syamzhena River, which, in turn, originates from Finnic languages and means "moss water" or "water from the swamp".

History
On July 15, 1929, Syamzhensky District with the center in the village of Yarygino was established and became a part of Vologda Okrug of Northern Krai. On August 5, 1931, the district was abolished, and on January 25, 1935 it was reestablished. The district center was established in the village of Dyakovskaya. In the same year, the selo of Syamzha was established by merging several villages at the crossing of the Syamzhena River by the highway connecting Vologda and Arkhangelsk. In 1953, the district center was transferred to Syamzha.

Economy

Industry
The economy of Syamzha is dominated by timber industry, which produces 82% of all goods in the district. There is also a butter factory.

Transportation
One of the principal highways in Russia, M8, which connects Moscow and Arkhangelsk, crosses Syamzhensky district from the south to the north, passing through Syamzha. There are also local roads, with the bus traffic originating from Syamzha.

Culture and recreation
In 2006, the Syamzhensky District Museum was opened in Syamzha. It displays archaeologic, ethnographic, and local interest collections.

References

Notes

Sources

Rural localities in Syamzhensky District